is a private, Catholic and  coeducational higher education institution run by the Society of the Divine Word (SVD) in the Shōwa Ward of Nagoya City, Aichi Prefecture, Japan. It is considered to be one of the most prestigious private universities in the Chūbu region.

History 
The on reading for "南山" is Nanzan. Also, in Chinese poetry "南山" refers to Mount Lushan until the Tang Dynasty and Mount Zhong Nan thereafter. Notably, the word appears in the classical poetry collection Shi Jing and the works of famous poet Li Bai. Thus, the choice of name is a celebration of longevity, perseverance, and prosperity for both the school and its alumni.

Divine Word Missionary Josef Reiners founded Nanzan Junior High School in 1932. Nanzan Foreign Language School was added to the Nanzan system in 1946. Later, as the Society of the Divine Word appointed Rev. Ralph Thyken, the American representative of Fu Jen Catholic University, to Japan to participate in the establishment of a new Nagoya Catholic University, and Nanzan Foreign Language School was formally renamed Nanzan University in 1949.

In 1995, Nagoya Seirei Junior College was subsumed by Nanzan when the two schools' organizations merged. In 2008, Nanzan plans to open an elementary school, officially named Nanzan University Affiliated Elementary School.

In 1961, Czech architect Antonin Raymond was commissioned to design most buildings on the Nagoya campus. It was one of the largest projects that he would undertake. The campus was orientated on a north–south axis across rolling hills and the eight buildings were arranged to suit the typography and harmonise with the landscape. In-situ concrete is used throughout the scheme and each building has its own concrete form, some with pilotis, others with shells.

Located to the east of the campus is the Divine Word Seminary Chapel, constructed in 1962. This is a building that exploits the plastic capacity of concrete, with two intersecting shells forming a bell tower. These are punctured with vertical slots which allow light to radiate along the curved interior walls.

 opened in 1968 as a women's junior college affiliated with the university. In 2011 the junior college campus was closed and reorganized as a department on Nanzan University's Nagoya campus offering courses in English language.

Organization 
Among coeducational universities, Nanzan is the only Catholic missionary school in the Chūbu region.

Nanzan has an active study abroad program with over 100 partner universities around the world. The Center for Japanese Studies opened in 1974, and is now one of the most prestigious Japanese language programs in Japan, accepting over 300 students a year into its fall, spring and summer programs.

For many years, Nanzan has held an annual competition with its Catholic sister schools  primarily focusing on athletics.

The humanities department offers priest training courses through its Christian studies curriculum.

Campus 

Nanzan's campus is in Yagoto, in the eastern part of Nagoya, in Shōwa-ku. The campus is about a 10-minute walk from either  or  station on the Nagoya Municipal Subway's Meijō Line.

Faculties and departments 
 Humanities
 Christian Studies
 Anthropology and Philosophy
 Psychology and Human Relations
 Japanese Studies
 Foreign Studies
 British and American Studies
 Spanish and Latin-American Studies
 French Studies
 German Studies
 Asian Studies
 Economics
 Business Administration
 Law
 Policy Studies
 Science and Technology
 Software Engineering
 Data Science
 Electronics and Communication Technology
 Mechanical Engineering and System Control
 Global Liberal Studies

Graduate schools and programs 
 Humanities
 Christian Thought
 Religious Thought
 Anthropology
 Educational Facilitation
 Linguistic Science
 International Area Studies
 Economics
 Economics
 Management
 Policy Studies
 Law
 Sciences and Engineering
 Systems and Mathematical Sciences
 Software Engineering
 Mechatronics
 Data Science
 Nanzan School of Law
 Legal Practice

Notable alumni and students 
 Ryohei, R&B singer.
 Masato Hayakawa, frontman of rock band Coldrain.
 HOME MADE KAZOKU, hip hop trio.
 Sakon Yamamoto, racecar driver (currently enrolled).
 Kazuki Nakajima, racecar driver (currently enrolled).

Affiliations 
Nanzan is a member of the ASEACCU (Association of Southeast and East Asian Catholic Colleges and Universities), an organization of Catholic institutes of higher learning in the Philippines, Australia, Thailand, Taiwan, South Korea, Indonesia and Japan. In addition to Nanzan, there are seven other Japanese members, including Sophia.

Sister schools 
 Sophia University
 Toyota Technological Institute

Associated schools 
 Nanzan Elementary School
 Nanzan Boys' Junior and Senior High School
 Nanzan Girls' Junior and Senior High School
 Nanzan International Junior and Senior High School
 Seirei Girls' Junior and Senior High School
 Misono Jogakuin Junior and Senior High School
 Misono Kindergarten
 Misono Maria Kindergarten

See also 
Close by to the main campus is the Showa Museum of Art.

References

External links 

Homepage of Nanzan University
Nanzan Junior College Department of English

 
Association of Christian Universities and Colleges in Asia
Japanese junior colleges
Educational institutions established in 1949
1949 establishments in Japan
Catholic universities and colleges in Japan